David Jiménez Rumbo (born 27 November 1970) is a Mexican politician. He currently serves as a federal deputy in the LXIII Legislature of the Mexican Congress, representing Guerrero from the fifth electoral region. From 2006 to 2012, he was a senator in the LX and LXI Legislatures.

Life
Jiménez Rumbo was born in Michoacán but obtained his bachelor's and master's degrees from the Universidad Autónoma de Guerrero. He was first elected to office in 2002 as a local deputy, serving as the PRD leader in the LVII Legislature of Guerrero; he also served in various positions in the Guerrero state PRD organization and as one of the party's national councilors. He was elected senator in 2006 and presided over the Jurisdictional and Social Development Commissions, along with a total of five other assignments.

In 2011, Jiménez Rumbo left the Senate to serve a brief term as the Guerrero secretary of social development. When this ended upon the election of a new state government, he attempted to secure the party's nomination for municipal president of Acapulco but failed. In 2015, the PRD included Jiménez Rumbo on its proportional representation list from the fifth region, electing him to the Chamber of Deputies for the first time. He sat on three commissions in San Lázaro, including a secretary position on the oversight commission for the Superior Auditor of the Federation.

In March 2018, while on leave from his seat, Jiménez Rumbo resigned from the PRD in protest over the alleged sale by the national party organization of the Acapulco mayoral candidacy to Joaquín "Jako" Badillo Escamilla, for 10 million pesos.

References

1970 births
Living people
Politicians from Michoacán
Members of the Senate of the Republic (Mexico)
21st-century Mexican politicians
Members of the Congress of Guerrero
Autonomous University of Guerrero alumni
Members of the Chamber of Deputies (Mexico)